Arakkulam  is a village in Idukki district in the Indian state of Kerala. Arakkulam is 16 km from Thodupuzha which is the gateway to the high ranges of Kerala. Thodupuzha-Idukki road goes through this village.  Arakulam is enriched with the Moovattupuzha River, the tail end of the Moolamattom Hydro Electric Power station, and where the Malankara Dam is located.

Demographics
 India census, Arakkulam had a population of 12633 with 6201 males and 6432 females.

References

Villages in Idukki district